Garth Haynes is an American former professional tennis player.

A native of Orinda, California, Haynes was a collegiate tennis player for Pepperdine University, competing in the 1979 and 1980 NCAA Division I championships. Active on the professional tour in the 1980s, he reached best rankings of 369 in singles and 233 in doubles. In 1983 he featured in the men's doubles main draws at both Wimbledon and US Open.

References

External links
 
 

Year of birth missing (living people)
Living people
American male tennis players
Pepperdine Waves men's tennis players
Tennis people from California
People from Orinda, California